Let's Fly is the first mini-album released by B1A4 under WM Entertainment on April 21, 2011. The songs were mainly composed by Lee Sang-ho but Im Sanghyuk (Beast’s main songwriter) and Jeon Dawoon (K.Will’s main songwriter) have participated in the album along with all the members especially Jinyoung who was directly involved with the songwriting. All rap lyrics were written by Baro.

Track listing

 "Only Learned Bad Things" samples an interlope from "Love on a Two-Way Street" (1970) by The Moments.

Charts

References

2011 debut EPs
Korean-language EPs
B1A4 EPs